Grammatophora is a genus of Chromista belonging to the family Grammatophoraceae.

The genus was first described by C. G. Ehrenberg in 1840.

Species:
 Grammatophora marina
 Grammatophora oceanica

References

Diatoms
Diatom genera